Danilo Almeida Alves (born 11 April 1991) is Brazilian professional footballer who plays as a forward, most recently for Chonburi in the Thai League 1.

Club career
On 4 January 2016, Alves joined Albanian Superliga side Flamurtari Vlorë by penning a contract until the end of the season. He was presented on the same day where he was allocated squad number 99. He made his competitive debut later on 24 January, starting in the first leg of 2015–16 Albanian Cup quarter-final tie against Tirana, unable to avoid the 0–1 home defeat. Alves' league debut would come six days later in the matchday 19 against Teuta Durrës, playing the entire match as Flamurtari took the first three points of 2016. Alves endured a 653-minute scoreless run across 7 matches until 2 April, when he scored his maiden Flamurtari goal, in a 1–1 away draw against the same opponents.

He had a slow first part of season, netting only once in 16 league matches; the opening of a 3–1 home win over newbie Lushnja on 16 September. Two weeks later, Alves received criticism from manager Shpëtim Duro after missing several good chances to score in the goalless home draw versus Luftëtari Gjirokastër. Alves responded the next day via a Facebook status, stating that Duro has put many players out of position, including him. The issue was solved two days later by club administrator Sinan Idrizi.

Alves captained Flamurtari for the first time on 19 November 2017 in the 0–1 win at Lushnja, wearing the armband from 41st minute following the substitution of Tomislav Bušić. In December 2017, he signed a new three-year contract that would keep him at Vlora until 2021.

Alves was the main protagonist of the 2017–18 Albanian Cup quarter-final first leg versus Partizani Tirana by netting a volley from 25 metres following a mistake from goalie Alban Hoxha to give Flamurtari the 1–0 win at home. It was his first goal after four months and 15 matches. Following the match Alves described the goal as a "big relief". Alves scored his first league goal since September 2017 on 4 February, a header in the 1–1 draw at Kukësi; it was the first time ever that Flamurtari doesn't lose at Zeqir Ymeri Stadium.

Career statistics

References

External links

Danilo Almeida Alves at the FSHF

1991 births
Living people
Brazilian footballers
Brazilian expatriate footballers
Association football forwards
Clube Atlético Penapolense players
Luverdense Esporte Clube players
Associação Portuguesa de Desportos players
Avaí FC players
Vila Nova Futebol Clube players
Clube Atlético Bragantino players
Criciúma Esporte Clube players
Esporte Clube São Bento players
Clube Atlético Sorocaba players
Flamurtari Vlorë players
FC Okzhetpes players
Suwon FC players
Campeonato Brasileiro Série C players
Campeonato Brasileiro Série B players
Kategoria Superiore players
TFF First League players
Kazakhstan Premier League players
K League 2 players
Danilo Alves
Danilo Alves
Brazilian expatriate sportspeople in Albania
Brazilian expatriate sportspeople in Turkey
Brazilian expatriate sportspeople in Kazakhstan
Brazilian expatriate sportspeople in South Korea
Expatriate footballers in Albania
Expatriate footballers in Turkey
Expatriate footballers in Kazakhstan
Expatriate footballers in South Korea